Meles Zenawi, who led Ethiopia as Prime Minister since 1995 and the chairman of the Ethiopian People's Revolutionary Democratic Front (EPRDF) since 1988, died on 20 August 2012 from undisclosed illness. Meles has been absent to public throughout a month and did not attend African Union summit in Addis Ababa. The has been speculated he has been in poor health condition and expected to recover before the Ethiopian New Year on 11 September 2012. 

His state funeral took place on 2 September with high-profile political figures around the world including 20 African leaders and US senior officials such as US Ambassador Susan Rice.

Information about illness and death
Meles died on 20 August 2012 from undisclosed illness. It was not known until the EU Commissioner spokesperson later announced Meles' death in Brussels, Belgium while he was undergoing surgery from secondary infection. He was not seen by the public for weeks and mounted speculation of missing in a summit in Addis Ababa one month ago. Meles' death announced to state television on 21 August where Bereket Simon, the Ministry of Information, read announcement as follows: 
It's a sad day for Ethiopia, the man who led our country for the past 21 years and brought economic and democratic changes, has died. We have lost our respected leader. Meles has been receiving treatment abroad. He was getting better and we were expecting him to return to Addis Ababa. But he developed a sudden infection and died around 11:40 pm last night. His body will be returned to Ethiopia soon. We have set up a committee to organise his funeral. More information will be released about that soon. The state television ETV announced that "Prime Minister Zenawi suddenly passed away last night. Meles was recovering in a hospital overseas for the past two months but died of a sudden infection at 11.40." 

Furthermore, he also announced:
As per Ethiopian law, Hailemariam Desalegn has now taken over the leadership. He will also be in charge of the Ethiopian military and all other government institutions. I would like to stress, nothing in Ethiopia will change. The government will continue. Our policies and institutions will continue. Nothing will change in Ethiopia. Desalegn will be confirmed by parliament.

Speaking to VOA Somali Service, Bereket did not mentioned where he died, or disclose the illness that led to his hospitalization.

Meles was disappeared in June and Western officials suspected that he died from liver cancer. But in mid-July, Bereket derided that he was in good condition saying that he is "very good and stable" and that he was just "taking some rest". The most recent images of Meles purportedly shown him thinner and he failed to attend a meeting of African Union in Addis Ababa. Meles was expected to recover back to normal health before the Ethiopian New Year on 11 September. Some analysis claimed Meles death as a result of catecholamine after verbal attack incident by Ethiopian journalist Abebe Gelaw.

Funeral

On the night of 21 August, the coffin containing Meles body from Brussels, arrived at Bole International Airport in Addis Ababa crowded by thousands of people –including politicians – were waiting to receive the coffin. Meles state funeral was conducted on 2 September with thousands of mourners gathered near Meskel Square to pay tribute. According to Ethiopian officials, the state funeral was attended in Addis Ababa by hundreds of political and public figures around the world, most of them were African leader, including South African President Jacob Zuma and Sudanese President Omar al-Bashir. Among regional leaders, President Jacob Zuma praised Meles and said Ethiopia lost "a patriot and a visionary". 

Posters, pictures and quotes of Meles were dispersed in every streets in Addis Ababa. The casket arrived at National Palace, where flag-draped coffin was on display. The coffin, adorned by flowers, then draped in the national flag and placed on a black carriage. Afterward, the casket slowly arrived at Meskel Square on horse-drawn carriage, where thousands of people awaiting to pay tribute. The funeral ceremony included military bands and religious leaders. The body then transported with entourage of motorcade to Holy Trinity Cathedral. Mourners were seen waving flag and some wept as they listen to then Prime Minister-elect Hailemariam Desalegn and other US officials speeches. The casket was interred into grave and covered with stone slabs, as wailing crowds jostled around the burial site. The coffin was accompanied by hundreds of mourners and Meles' wife Azeb Mesfin, who was seen being comforted by officials.

Reactions
Assefa Seifu, a citric of Meles government called him "a devil incarnate". Kenyan Prime Minister Raila Odinga expressed his condolences "We need a seamless, peaceful, transition of power. The region, the horn of Africa, needs stability."
Olympic gold medalist and Ethiopian national Haile Gebrselassie praised Meles' achievements.
 n President Paul Kagame: "His was a life of immense courage, vision and enterprise which he devoted to the advancement of his fellow citizens in this country and across Africa."
  Ambassador to the U.N Susan Rice described Meles as "unpretentious and direct".
 Contemporary United Nations Secretary-General Ban Ki-moon praised Meles' "exceptional leadership."
i Prime Minister Benjamin Netanyahu's office issued a statement that read: "[Netanyahu] presented his condolences to the Ethiopian people. Meles was loved in his country. He was also a true friend of Israel. During his mandate, Ethiopia became one of Israel's closest friends."
 Prime Minister David Cameron called Meles "an inspirational spokesman for Africa."
 President Barack Obama released the statement: "It was with sadness that I learned of the passing of Prime Minister Meles Zenawi of Ethiopia. Prime Minister Meles deserves recognition for his lifelong contribution to Ethiopia’s development, particularly his unyielding commitment to Ethiopia’s poor. I met with Prime Minister Meles at the G-8 Summit in May and recall my personal admiration for his desire to lift millions of Ethiopians out of poverty through his drive for food security. I am also grateful for Prime Minister Meles’s service for peace and security in Africa, his contributions to the African Union, and his voice for Africa on the world stage. On behalf of the American people, I offer my condolences to Prime Minister Meles' family and to the people of Ethiopia on this untimely loss and confirm the U.S. Government's commitment to our partnership with Ethiopia. Going forward, we encourage the Government of Ethiopia to enhance its support for development, democracy, regional stability and security, human rights, and prosperity for its people."
n President Lee Myung-bak released this statement: "The passing of Prime Minister Meles is being mourned across the globe. We all have just lost a great leader of Ethiopia and a preeminent advocate for Africa and the developing world. [...] I pray for the repose of a truly bright mind who lived an intense and moving life – my close friend."

Western NGOs Amnesty International called for the new administration to end Meles' "ever-increasing repression" and Human Rights Watch similarly added that the next administration should repeal the 2009 anti-terrorism law. As The New York Times asked about a gap between the United States of America's strategic and ideological goals in relation to its support for Meles' government, it quoted HRW researcher Leslie Lefkow as saying: "There is an opportunity here. If donors are shrewd, they will use the opportunity that this presents to push a much stronger and bolder human rights stance and need for reform." Author Dan Connell, who had interviewed Meles in June, said that "he seemed focused [then] on wrapping up a number of major projects as if he were aware the end was near. Meles knew his days were numbered." The Committee to Protect Journalists cited and criticised the secrecy around Meles' death. The Washington Post said that the "circumstances of his death remained laced with intrigue."

Regional groups responded with the Ogaden National Liberation Front saying it hoped his death "may usher [in] a new era of stability and peace" and Al Shabaab that it was celebrating the "uplifting news."

References

2012 in Ethiopia